Umari is a coastal village in Central Papua, Indonesia. The average temperature rarely falls below 18°Celsius and rarely above 25°Celsius.

References

Villages in Central Papua